KAFF (930 AM) is a radio station broadcasting a classic country format. Licensed to Flagstaff, Arizona, United States, it serves the Flagstaff area.  The station is currently owned by Roger and Nancy Anderson, through licensee Flagstaff Radio, Inc., and features programming from ABC News Radio.

930 AM is a regional broadcast frequency. KAFF is a 5,000-watt daytime station, with low power nighttime authority (31 watts). KAFF is rebroadcast on FM translator K228XO 93.5 FM and is branded as KAFF Legends 93-5 AM930.

History
KAFF went on the air in late October 1962 as KFGT. It was an automated station owned by Gene Philippi. Not long after signing on, the station went silent and was sold to Guy Christian, who changed the callsign to KAFF and put the station back on air that fall.

An FM sister station, KFLG, signed on in 1968, originally playing adult contemporary during the day, country at night and classical music for a few hours on Sunday. The two stations swapped call letters on March 1, 1982, with the FM station becoming KAFF and the AM station becoming KFLG. On December 16, 1986, KFLG changed its call sign back to KAFF.

Translators
KAFF rebroadcasts on the following translator:

References

External links
 FCC History Cards for KAFF

 

AFF
Classic country radio stations in the United States
Radio stations established in 1962
1962 establishments in Arizona